Fire Station Number 4 in Asheville, North Carolina, also known as Merrimon Avenue Fire Station, is a historic fire station. It was built in 1927, and is a two-story, flat roofed, multi-colored brick building in the Art Deco style.  It features a five-story tower with an open-shaft staircase.

It was listed on the National Register of Historic Places in 2000.

References

Fire stations on the National Register of Historic Places in North Carolina
Art Deco architecture in North Carolina
Fire stations completed in 1927
Buildings and structures in Asheville, North Carolina
National Register of Historic Places in Buncombe County, North Carolina
1927 establishments in North Carolina